Vava Voom is the seventh studio album by Bassnectar released on April 10, 2012, through his label Amorphous Music. The album includes several collaborations with artists from other genres; most notably, Lupe Fiasco.  The song "Pennywise Tribute" is a remix of the Pennywise song "Bro Hymn (Tribute)" from their Full Circle album.

Track listing

Charts

References

http://www.bassnectar.net/2012/03/vava-voom-pre-order-the-new-album-now/
http://www.themusicninja.com/bassnectar-feat-lupe-fiasco-vava-voom/

2012 albums
Bassnectar albums